Eremitic is the debut full-length studio album of Seirom, independently released on June 6, 2011.

Track listing

Personnel
Adapted from the Eremitic liner notes.
 Maurice de Jong (as Mories) – vocals, guitar, bass guitar, trumpet, drums, percussion, synthesizer, effects, recording, cover art

Release history

References

External links 
 
 Eremitic at Bandcamp

2011 debut albums
Seirom albums